Llewellin is a surname. Notable people with the surname include:

David Llewellin (born 1960), Welsh rally driver
John Llewellin, 1st Baron Llewellin GBE, PC, MC, TD (1893–1957), British army officer, Conservative Party politician
Llewelyn Llewellin (died 1878), the first Dean of St David's Cathedral
Philip Llewellin (1940–2005), British journalist and writer
Richard Llewellin (born 1938), retired Anglican bishop in the Church of England

See also
Llewellin Setter, strain of English setters bred by R.L. Purcell Llewellin to be perfect for foot hunting and early field trials
Llewelen